İpek Şenoğlu (born 8 June 1979), nicknamed İpeko, is a former Turkish tennis player.

She first made history in June 2004, when she was accepted into the women's doubles qualifying for Wimbledon. Though Şenoğlu did not advance into the main draw of Wimbledon, she became the first Turk ever to play in a qualifying tournament for a Grand Slam event.

On 15 May 2005, Venus Williams played a show game with Şenoğlu on the Bosporus Bridge in Istanbul, the first tennis match ever to be played across two continents. The event was organized as a promotion ahead of the 2005 İstanbul Cup and lasted five minutes only on the north side of the bridge. After the exhibition, they both threw a tennis ball into the Bosporus.

She and partner Yaroslava Shvedova reached the semifinals of the 2009 Italian Open, a WTA Premier event. Following this event, İpek's WTA doubles rank rose to No. 76. Her peak doubles rank has been No. 53.

WTA career finals

Doubles: 1 (runner-up)

ITF finals

Singles: 10 (2–8)

Doubles: 44 (21–23)

See also
 Turkish women in sports

References

External links
 
 
 
 Her official website 

1979 births
Living people
Turkish female tennis players
Sportspeople from Eskişehir
21st-century Turkish women